is a multi-purpose commercial facility in Abenosuji Itchome, Abeno-ku, Osaka, Japan. It consists of the New Annex, Eastern Annex and a supertall skyscraper, Abeno Harukas.

The facility is the planned alternative station building of Ōsaka Abenobashi Station, the terminal of Kintetsu Minami Osaka Line. It contains Kintetsu Department Store Main Store Abeno Harukas, Marriott International hotel, university campuses and Sharp Corporation sales office. Construction was completed on March 7, 2014.

Name meaning
The name of the skyscraper "Abeno Harukas" comes from the old Japanese word "晴るかす" (harukasu). It means "to brighten, to clear up".

Floors
Abeno Harukas
58th-60th floors: Observatory "Harukas 300"
38th-55th floors and 57th floor: Osaka Marriott Miyako Hotel
57th floor: Restaurants
38th-55th floors: Guest rooms
21st-36th floors: offices
19th and 20th floors: Osaka Marriott Miyako Hotel (lobby)
17th and 18th floors: offices
16th floor: Abeno Harukas Museum, rooftop garden
2nd basement-14th floors: Kintetsu Department Store Main Store Abeno Harukas Tower Building
1st basement and 1st floor: Osaka Abenobashi Station
4th and 3rd basements: parking lot

New Building
2nd basement-9th floors and rooftop: Kintetsu Department Store Main Store Abeno Harukass Wing Building
1st basement and 1st floor: Osaka Abenobashi Station
2nd basement: Osaka Abenobashi Station Entrance

Eastern Building
1st basement-16th floors: Miyako City Osaka Tennoji

Shopping facilities around Abenobashi Terminal Building

Abeno-ku
Shinjuku Building
Shinjuku Gochiso Building
Abeno Appolo
Abeno Center Building (Abeno Festa)
Echo Across Building
Abeno Urban Development Project
Abeno Lucias (A1-1)
Abeno nini (A1-2)
Abeno Cues Town (A2)
Abeno Gran Tour (A3)

Tennoji-ku
Tennoji MiO
Main Building
Plaza Annex
Abechika (underground city)

Gallery

See also
 List of tallest buildings in Osaka
 List of tallest buildings in Japan

References
 Kintetsu Press 
 Kintetsu Press release on August 25, 2011

External links
Takenaka Corporation for Design and Construction of Abeno Harukas
Kintetsu Department Store 
Abeno Harukas
Kintetsu Corporation

Skyscraper office buildings in Japan
Skyscraper hotels in Japan
Retail buildings in Japan
Skyscrapers in Osaka
César Pelli buildings
Togo Murano buildings
Kintetsu Group Holdings
Abeno-ku, Osaka